State Tourism Agency of the Republic of Azerbaijan is a governmental body established according to the decree of the president of Azerbaijan on the improvement of public administration in the field of culture and tourism.

History 
The agency was established on April 20, 2018, on the basis of the Ministry of Culture and Tourism of the Republic of Azerbaijan.

On April 21, 2018, by the presidential decree “On the new composition of the Cabinet of Ministers of the Republic of Azerbaijan” Fuad Nagiyev was appointed as the Chairman of the State Tourism Agency.

Structure 
By the decree of the president dated September 21, 2018, the structure of the agency is as following: Apparatus of State Tourism Agency of the Republic of Azerbaijan (divisions and sectors) and Regional Tourism Offices.

By the presidential decree “On ensuring activity of the State Tourism Agency of the Republic of Azerbaijan” dated September 21, 2018, the number of employees was determined at 55 staff units.

Areas of activity 
The activities of the agency defined by the decree of the president dated September 21, 2018 are as following:

 to participate in forming a unified state policy in the relevant area and to ensure the implementation of this policy;
 to carry out normative activities in the relevant field;
 to carry out state regulation, state control and coordination in the relevant field;
 to provide related activities with other government agencies, enterprises and organizations, as well as physical and legal persons, including international and non-governmental organizations, for the purpose of developing tourism;
 to organize purposeful use of the territory of the above-mentioned and ensure their preservation; 
 to ensure the protection and promotion of national culinary examples.

By the same decree, the duties of the agency include:

 to carry out tasks arising from the normalization activities in the relevant field;
 develop and implement state programs and development concepts related to the relevant field;
 to ensure the implementation of human and civil rights and freedoms in relation to the activities;
 to ensure the improvement of tourism services through subordinate agencies;
 to carry out scientific researches and investigations to determine the current situation in the field of tourism, future development directions, as well as perspectives;
 to ensure the development of health, sports, mountain and winter tourism, cultural, extreme, business, ecological tourism, beach, hunting tourism and other types of tourism;
 to participate in the development of the tourism infrastructure, including the relevant air, sea, automobile and rail networks, and to make proposals with relevant agencies for the purpose of raising the level of service in those roads;
 to ensure the development of sea passenger transport services in the Caspian Sea, as well as in its Baku watercourse with related organizations;
 to carry out control over the activities of educational institutions under the Agency, make suggestions on the determination of directions and specialties in the field of tourism;
 to encourage investment in education programs in tourism;
 to coordinate the work of other executive authorities in the relevant field, as well as the activities of the relevant bodies, associations and legal entities;
 to coordinate international relations in the relevant field, to join international organizations on the field and to make proposals on signing relevant international documents;

International Cooperation 
The State Tourism Agency of the Republic of Azerbaijan is currently cooperating with many international organizations such as World Tourism Organization UNWTO, Black Sea Economic Cooperation (BSEC), Cooperation Council of Turkic Speaking States, Organization for Democracy and Economic Development (GUAM), Economic Cooperation Organization (ECO) and several other organizations. Based on the bilateral cooperation with World Tourism Organization UNWTO, the Agency represented Azerbaijan in 109th Session of the executive board of UNWTO held in Manama, Bahrain, from October 30 to November 1, 2018. Additionally, the upcoming 110th session of the Executive Council of the UNWTO is expected to be held in Baku on June 17–19, 2019.

On November 2, 2018, the State Tourism Agency participated in the conference held by BSEC in Istanbul.

On August 7, 2018, within the framework of cooperation with Cooperation Council of Turkic Speaking States, the representatives of the State Tourism Agency and the Azerbaijan Tourism Bureau took part in the 13th session of the Working Group on Tourism in Astana.

At the end of 2018, Agency opened representative offices in six countries- Germany, UAE, Saudi Arabia, China, India and Russia.

Subordinate agencies 
Educational institutions (Azerbaijan Tourism and Management University, Baku Tourism Vocational School and Mingachevir Tourism College).

Tourism Information Centers (Baku, Quba, Khachmaz, Shamakhi, Ismayilli, Qabala, Zaqatala, Ganja, Barda, Lankaran and Shaki Tourism Information Centers).

Azerbaijan Tourism Board - it is a public legal entity within the State Travel Agency of the Republic of Azerbaijan. The main goal of the organization is to strengthen the competitiveness of the country in the global tourism market by forming the tourism brand of Azerbaijan and promoting it both locally and internationally.

Reserves Management Center- it is a public legal entity established under the State Tourism Agency. The Center deals with implementation of scientific, historical and cultural study and additionally preservation, development and purposeful use of elements of historical tangible and intangible cultural heritages are subordinated to the State Tourism Agency of the Republic of Azerbaijan. "Yanar Mountain" State Historical-Cultural and Natural Reserve, “Ateshgah Temple” State Historical-Architectural Reserve, Basgal State Historical-Cultural Reserve, State Historical, Architectural and Ethnographic Reserve Khinalig, Lahij Historical-Cultural Reserve, Yukhari Bash Historical-Architectural Reserve (“Caravanserai” historical complex in Sheki) and Kish State Historical-Architectural Reserve are regulated by Reserves Management Center.

See also 
 Ministry of Culture (Azerbaijan)
 Tourism in Azerbaijan

References 

Tourism agencies
Tourism in Azerbaijan